Cnemaspis affinis, also known as Stoliczka's gecko or Pinang Island rock gecko, is a species of gecko endemic to Malaysia.

References

Cnemaspis
Reptiles described in 1870